Wiqruqucha (Quechua wiqru twisted, bent, qucha lake, "bent lake", hispanicized spelling Huegro Cocha) is a lake in Peru located in the Huánuco Region, Huamalíes Province, Chavín de Pariarca District, near the village Wiqru (Huegro). Its waters flow to a stream named Qallu (Quechua for tongue, hispanicized Gallo, Callo) and then to Marañón River.

References 

Lakes of Peru
Lakes of Huánuco Region